The Storgangen mine is one of the largest titanium mines in Norway. The mine is located near Sandbekk, Rogaland. The mine has reserves amounting to 60 million tonnes of ore grading 17-18% titanium.

References 

Titanium mines in Norway